Kevin John Sutherland (born July 4, 1964) is an American professional golfer who plays on the PGA Tour and PGA Tour Champions.

Sutherland was born in Sacramento, California and graduated from Christian Brothers High School. He attended Fresno State University and made the golf team as a walk-on freshman. Teased by his teammates for his unorthodox swing and unusual grip, he silenced his peers as he gained All-American status twice in his four years at Fresno State and became the most successful player ever to have spent time there. His younger brother David also attended Fresno while Kevin was there and followed in his brother's footsteps as an All-American golfer.

As a professional, Sutherland qualified for the PGA Tour in 1992. He won the WGC-Accenture Match Play Championship in 2002 in his 184th start. It was his only PGA Tour win in 447 starts. He had an exceptional 2008 season that included 6 top ten finishes, including playoff losses to Vijay Singh at the 2008 Barclays and Cameron Beckman at the 2008 Frys.com Open. This runner-up finish vaulted Sutherland well inside the top thirty on the 2008 PGA Tour money list, and secured him a spot in the 2009 Masters Tournament.

He has featured in the top 50 of the Official World Golf Rankings, peaking at 32nd in 2002. Back and neck injuries forced Sutherland to limit his PGA Tour career in 2011 and 2012. Sutherland returned to playing full-time in 2013. He fell short of satisfying his medical extension, but earned enough to remain on the PGA Tour with conditional status for the remainder of 2013.

On Saturday, August 16, 2014, at the second round of the Dick's Sporting Goods Open, Sutherland became the first person on the Champions Tour to shoot a 59, going −13 on the par-72 course.

On November 12, 2017, Sutherland earned his first PGA Tour Champions win at the Charles Schwab Cup Championship and overcame the seven wins of Bernhard Langer to win the Charles Schwab Cup.

On April 1, 2019, Sutherland won his second PGA Tour Champions tournament at the Rapiscan Systems Classic in Mississippi. Sutherland won in a seven-hole playoff over Scott Parel. The playoff was held over two days because play had to be suspended on Sunday March 31, 2019 due to darkness. Sutherland and Parel faced off in a playoff again in June at the Principal Charity Classic with Sutherland winning on the second extra hole.

In November 2020, Sutherland won the Charles Schwab Cup Championship for the second time. Sutherland won in a Monday finish on the ninth playoff hole over Paul Broadhurst. On February 28, 2021, Sutherland won the Cologuard Classic in Tucson, Arizona. He won by two strokes over Mike Weir.

Professional wins (8)

PGA Tour wins (1)

PGA Tour playoff record (0–3)

Other wins (2)

PGA Tour Champions wins (5)

PGA Tour Champions playoff record (3–2)

Results in major championships

CUT = missed the half-way cut
"T" = tied

Summary

Most consecutive cuts made – 8 (2005 PGA – 2009 PGA)
Longest streak of top-10s – 1 (twice)

Results in The Players Championship

CUT = missed the halfway cut
"T" indicates a tie for a place

World Golf Championships

Wins (1)

Results timeline

1Canceled due to 9/11

QF, R16, R32, R64 = Round in which player lost in match play
"T" = Tied
NT = No tournament
Note that the HSBC Champions did not become a WGC event until 2009.

Results in senior major championships
Results not in chronological order before 2022.

"T" indicates a tie for a place
NT = No tournament due to COVID-19 pandemic

See also
1995 PGA Tour Qualifying School graduates
1996 PGA Tour Qualifying School graduates
Lowest rounds of golf

References

External links

American male golfers
Fresno State Bulldogs men's golfers
PGA Tour golfers
PGA Tour Champions golfers
Golfers from Sacramento, California
1964 births
Living people